Adieu may refer to:

A word meaning "goodbye" in English and French
Derived from Old French into Middle English and Modern French, with English better preserving the original pronunciation:
 the English word, pronounced a.dju (rhyming with "you" in numerous works of English literature)
 the French word, pronounced a.djø, plural adieux

Books
Adieu (fr),  1830 story by Honoré de Balzac from La Comédie humaine 
Adieu (fr), 1884 story from Guy de Maupassant bibliography

Film and TV
 Adieu (:fr:Adieu (film)), a 2003 (released 2004) French film by Arnaud des Pallières starring Michael Lonsdale, Olivier Gourmet and Laurent Lucas

Music

Classical
Adieu, a composition for piano by Edward Elgar
 Adieu (Stockhausen), a 1966 composition for wind quintet by Karlheinz Stockhausen
Adieu, a 1986 composition for string quartet by Bent Sørensen
Les adieux Beethoven: Piano Sonata No. 26 in E flat major, Op. 81a

Albums
Adieu (album), Logan Lynn 2016
Adieu, album by French singer Michèle Torr 1983

Songs
 "Adieu" (Jahn Teigen and Anita Skorgan song), the Norwegian entry in the Eurovision Song Contest 1982
 "Adieu" (Cowboy Bebop), a song composed by Yoko Kanno for the anime Cowboy Bebop
 "Adieu", a song by British band Enter Shikari from Take to the Skies, 2007 
 "Adieu" (Cœur de pirate song), 2011
 "Adieu", by Eleni Karaindrou from Dust of Time, 2009
 "So Long, Farewell", a song in The Sound of Music that includes the lyrics "Adieu, adieu, adieu / To you and you and you"
 "Adieu", a song by German band Rammstein from Zeit, 2022

Artist 

 Adieu, the stage name of Moka Kamishiraishi

See also 
 Adiós (disambiguation)